Mount Machray is located on the border of Alberta and British Columbia. It was named in 1923 after Robert Machray, Archbishop of Rupert's Land.

See also
 List of peaks on the Alberta–British Columbia border
 Mountains of Alberta
 Mountains of British Columbia

References

Machray
Machray
Canadian Rockies